Vasconcellea parviflora is a species of shrub in the family Caricaceae. It is native to SW Ecuador and NW Peru. It is polygamous, i.e. it can be dioecious or monoecious, showing either or both pistillate and staminate flowers (Badillo, 1993).

References

parviflora